Eric Johana Omondi (born 18 August 1994) is a Kenyan professional footballer who plays for Thai club Muangthong United as an attacking midfielder or a winger.

Club career
On 26 January 2022, Johana Omondi joined Waasland-Beveren in Belgium as a free agent, on a 6-month contract.

International career
Johana has 11 caps for the Kenyan National team; his debut game was against Ethiopia on 4 July 2015 at Nyayo stadium and his maiden goal was the winning goal for Kenya against Congo at Kasarani Stadium with a 2–1 final score line.

International goals
Scores and results list Kenya's goal tally first.

Honours
Individual
Kenya Premier League midfielder of the year 2015.

References

External links
http://www.soka.co.ke/tag/eric_johanna
http://www.soka.co.ke/news/item/wanyama-hails-youngsters-calls-for-better-preparations
http://www.soka.co.ke/news/item/johanna-the-hero-as-kenya-floors-congo
http://www.soka.co.ke/news/item/highly-rated-johanna-chuffed-at-harambee-stars-chance

1994 births
Living people
Kenyan footballers
Kenya international footballers
Association football midfielders
Mathare United F.C. players
Vasalunds IF players
Jönköpings Södra IF players
IF Brommapojkarna players
S.K. Beveren players
Eric Johana Omondi
Kenyan Premier League players
Allsvenskan players
Superettan players
2019 Africa Cup of Nations players
Kenyan expatriate footballers
Kenyan expatriate sportspeople in Sweden
Expatriate footballers in Sweden
Kenyan expatriate sportspeople in Belgium
Expatriate footballers in Belgium